The women's 500 metres competition at the 2022 European Speed Skating Championships was held on 8 January 2022.

Results
The race was started at 14:50.

References

Women's 500 metres